Hillards plc was a small supermarket chain from the North of England, bought out in a hostile takeover by Tesco in May 1987.

History

The company was founded by John Wesley Hillard in 1885, in the West Yorkshire town of Cleckheaton. The first shop was opened in Lion Chambers there, and shortly after 1900, there were twenty shops operating as Lion Stores. By 1951, there were over seventy stores, and by 1968, it had warehouse size stores in Wakefield, Lincoln and York.

In 1970, the trade name Lion Stores was dropped in favour of Hillards and in 1972, the company was first listed on the London Stock Exchange. Peter Hartley, a grandson of the founder, became executive chairman in 1983 and in May 1987, following a hostile bid, the business was acquired by Tesco for £220m.

References

External links
 List of Hillards Stores

Retail companies established in 1885
Retail companies disestablished in 1987
Defunct supermarkets of the United Kingdom
Companies formerly listed on the London Stock Exchange
Companies based in Kirklees